Târgu Neamț is a town in Neamț County, Western Moldavia, Romania, on the river Neamț. It had, a population of 20,496. Three villages are administered by the town: Blebea, Humulești, and Humuleștii Noi.

History 

Originally a market town, hence its name (in Romanian "târg" = market), it had an important role in Moldavian culture. It was first mentioned in a late-14th century document.

The name neamț is a generic name of Slavic origin for the German people in the Romanian language. This has led to speculation of a German foundation of Târgu Neamț, according to which Saxon colonists crossed the Carpathians from the Bistrița area and built a commercial township. Some Romanian historians, including Bogdan Petriceicu Hasdeu consider that Târgu Neamț was probably a German settlement from the 13th century, when the Teutonic Order made incursions from Transylvania against the Cumanic peoples that were living in Moldavia.

Nowadays, historians disagree with this possibility mostly because of the long-lasting influences of the communist-nationalistic historiography which refused to accept the town was anything else than a Romanian-founded settlement.

Access
The planned East-West Motorway will bypass the town on its south when completed, providing access to Iași (to the east) and Târgu Mureș to the west. The railroad station is the terminus station of CFR Line 517 linking it to Pașcani via an electrified railway.

Tourism and attractions
 The Neamț Fortress (Cetatea Neamțului) was built in the 14th century by Voivode Petru I (possibly on the ruins of a smaller Teutonic castle), and is located on the north bank of the Neamț River.
It is close to the Ceahlău Massif, Durău, and the Bistrița Valley.
 Ion Creangă memorial house in Humulești, across the Ozana river: This is the house where the famous Romanian writer was born and where he spent his childhood. The stories from Ion Creangă's masterpiece, Amintiri din copilărie ("Memories of my childhood"), revolve around Humulești, Târgu Neamț, and the surrounding villages.
 Monumentul Eroilor (Heroes' Monument): an obelisk that commemorates the Romanian soldiers who fought in World War I is found on Pleșu Hill, near the Pometea suburb. It commands views of the town and the surrounding mountains.
 The Vânători-Neamț Natural Park, housing a herd of wisent, the European bisons that once roamed the Eastern Carpathians.
 The Nicolae Popa ethnographic museum în Târpești.

Natives 
 Dumitru Botez
 Constantin Cojocariu
 Ana Conta-Kernbach
 
 
 Ion Creangă
 
 
 Emanoil Dumitrescu
 
 Moshe Idel
 Irving Layton
 Gabriela Mihalschi
 Mariana Simionescu
 Valentin Ursache

Gallery

References

Populated places in Neamț County
Shtetls
13th-century establishments in Romania
Towns in Romania
Localities in Western Moldavia
Monotowns in Romania